Eduardo Teus López-Navarro, also known as Teus (November 6, 1896 – October 8, 1958), was a Filipino footballer, of Spanish descent, who played for Real Madrid as a goalkeeper. Teus later became a sports journalist and was later tasked by Francisco Franco to manage the Spain national football team as head coach. He managed the national team from 1941 to 1942.

Teus died due to a head stroke while watching a game at the press box of the San Mamés Stadium in Bilbao.

References

1896 births
1958 deaths
Sportspeople from Manila
Filipino footballers
Spanish footballers
Footballers from Metro Manila
Association football goalkeepers
Real Madrid CF players